Our Lady of Lourdes Church is a historic church at 105 N. William St. in Victoria, Texas.

It was built in 1923 and added to the National Register of Historic Places in 1986.

See also

National Register of Historic Places listings in Victoria County, Texas

References

Roman Catholic churches in Texas
Churches on the National Register of Historic Places in Texas
Roman Catholic churches completed in 1923
20th-century Roman Catholic church buildings in the United States
Churches in Victoria County, Texas
National Register of Historic Places in Victoria, Texas
Recorded Texas Historic Landmarks